Griffith Davies (1868-1962) was a Welsh poet from the Llanuwchllyn area Merionethshire. He was raised by his mother, his father having died before he was born, and was educated at the local school, and for a time at Owen Owen's (1850 - 1920) school in Oswestry. For most of his life he lived as a farmer, farming Bryncaled farm in Merionethshire. He also served as a deacon of Yr Hen Gapel (Congregational church), Llanuwchllyn, and was for a time Vice-President of the Merioneth Historical Society.

His writings include a number of contributions to the local press, and articles written for 'Y Tyst', 'Dysgedydd', and 'Geninen'. In 1910 he published a booklet containing his awdl (long poem) to Michael D. Jones. Awen Gwyndaf Llanuwchllyn, a volume of his works, was published posthumously in 1966, edited by James Nicholas. He died in 1962, and was buried in the new cemetery at Llanuwchllyn.

References 

1868 births
1962 deaths
19th-century Welsh poets
20th-century Welsh poets
19th-century Welsh writers
20th-century Welsh writers